Chimney Meadows is a  biological Site of Special Scientific Interest between Abingdon-on-Thames and Faringdon in Oxfordshire. It is also a national nature reserve, and part of the  Chimney Meadows nature reserve, which is managed by the Berkshire, Buckinghamshire and Oxfordshire Wildlife Trust.

This site, which consists of six botanically rich alluvial meadows, is bordered on the south by the River Thames. The meadows are intersected by ditches, most of which are covered in reed canary-grass. The most common grasses are crested dog's-tail, creeping bent, perennial rye-grass, hairy sedge and glaucous sedge.

References

External links
Map of Chimney Meadows

 

Berkshire, Buckinghamshire and Oxfordshire Wildlife Trust
Sites of Special Scientific Interest in Oxfordshire
National nature reserves in England